Brazil competed at the 2013 World Championships in Athletics in Moscow, Russia, from 10–18 August 2013.
A team of 32 athletes were announced to represent the country in the event.

Results
(q – qualified, NM – no mark, SB – season best)

Men
Track and road events

Field events

Decathlon

Women
Track and road events

Field events

See also
Brazil at the World Championships in Athletics

References

External links
IAAF World Championships – Brazil

Nations at the 2013 World Championships in Athletics
World Championships in Athletics
2013